Agence Nationale de l'Aviation Civile et de la Météorologie (ANACIM), in English the National Agency of Civil Aviation and Meteorology, is the national civil aviation authority and meteorology agency of Senegal, with its head office on the property of Léopold Sédar Senghor International Airport in Dakar.

ANACIM was formed after two agencies, the Agence Nationale de l'Aviation Civile du Sénégal (ANACS), and the country's national meteorology agency merged as part of decree 2011-1055 of 28 July 2011.

Previously Service Enquête et Analyse (English Inquiry and Analysis Service) of the ANACIM, formerly a part of ANACS, investigated aviation accidents and incidents. It is now a separate agency, Bureau d'Enquêtes et d'Analyses pour la Sécurité de l'Aviation Civile (BEA Senegal).

References

External links

 Agence Nationale de l'Aviation Civile et de la Météorologie 
 Agence Nationale de l'Aviation Civile du Sénégal 

Government of Senegal
Aviation organisations based in Senegal
Senegal
Organizations investigating aviation accidents and incidents
2011 establishments in Senegal
Organizations established in 2011
Civil aviation in Senegal